Colin Bloomfield (18 November 1918 – 24 November 1984) was a Jamaican cricketer. He played in two first-class matches for the Jamaican cricket team in 1946/47 and 1947/48.

See also
 List of Jamaican representative cricketers

References

External links
 

1918 births
1984 deaths
Jamaican cricketers
Jamaica cricketers
Cricketers from Kingston, Jamaica